Rale may refer to:

Rales, lung sounds
 Rale, musical instrument; see List of Caribbean membranophones

See also
Rail (disambiguation)
Rayl (disambiguation)